Maymorn, a rural area of Upper Hutt city in the  Wellington region of New Zealand, consists of Rural Hill and Rural Valley Floor zones. The New Zealand census treats Maymorn as part of Te Mārua for statistical purposes.  The usual resident 2013 population of the Te Mārua area was 1,152.  The area has a tranquil setting and consists of lifestyle blocks and farms surrounded by hills that are usually covered with a dusting of snow in the winter.

Because it is marginally populated, the area is best known for the Maymorn railway station, which is on the  Wairarapa railway line between  Woodville and  Wellington and served by the Wairarapa Connection daily passenger-train.

Maymorn station is near the southern portal of the  Rimutaka railway tunnel, which opened in 1955 and replaced the Rimutaka Incline railway-line which ran over the Rimutaka Range. The old route passes within 40 metres over the tunnel's exit.

See also
 Maymorn Railway Station
 Rimutaka Incline Railway
 Rimutaka Rail Trail
 Hiking Mt Clime in the Pakuratahi Forest
 Rimutaka Cycle Trail
 Cycle Maymorn

References

Suburbs of Upper Hutt